Crow is an unincorporated community in Wood County, Texas, United States at the intersection of U.S. Highway 80 and Texas Farm to Market Road 778.

The residents of Crow have held an annual Fourth of July picnic for over a century.

External links 
 Handbook of Texas online
 

Unincorporated communities in Wood County, Texas
Unincorporated communities in Texas